The 2012 MTV Video Music Awards Japan was held in Chiba on June 23, 2012, at the Makuhari Messe and was hosted by Japanese trio Perfume. The nominees were announced on March 21, 2012.

Awards

Video of the Year
Exile — "Rising Sun"
Lady Gaga — "You and I"
Red Hot Chili Peppers — "The Adventures of Rain Dance Maggie"
Girls' Generation — "Mr. Taxi"
Tokyo Jihen — "Kon'ya wa Karasawagi"

Album of the Year
'Girls' Generation — Girls' GenerationColdplay — Mylo Xyloto
Juju — You
Kara — Super Girl
Lady Gaga — Born This Way

Best Male VideoBruno Mars — "It Will Rain"David Guetta (featuring Flo Rida and Nicki Minaj) — "Where Them Girls At"
Gen Hoshino — "Film"
Justin Bieber — "Mistletoe"
Naoto Inti Raymi — "Brave"

Best Female VideoNamie Amuro — "Love Story"Ayaka — "Hajimari no Toki"
Björk — "Crystalline"
Kana Nishino — "Tatoe Donnani…"
Rihanna featuring Calvin Harris — "We Found Love"

Best Group Video2PM — "I'm Your Man" 
Coldplay — "Paradise"
Ikimonogakari — "Itsudatte Bokura Wa"
Maroon 5 featuring Christina Aguilera — "Moves Like Jagger"
Monkey Majik — "Hero"

Best New Artist2NE1 — "I Am The Best" 
CN Blue — "In My Head"
James Blake — "Limit to Your Love"
Kyary Pamyu Pamyu — "Tsukema Tsukeru"
LMFAO — "Party Rock Anthem"

Best Rock VideoOne Ok Rock — "Answer Is Near"Bon Iver — "Holocene"
Radwimps — "Kimi to Hitsuji to Ao"
Red Hot Chili Peppers — "The Adventures of Rain Dance Maggie"
Sakanaction — "Bach no Senritsu o Yoru ni Kiita Sei Desu."

Best Pop VideoSandaime J Soul Brothers — "Fighters"Namie Amuro — "Naked"
Beyoncé — "Run the World (Girls)"
Ikimono-gakari — "Itsudatte Bokura Wa"
Rihanna featuring Calvin Harris — "We Found Love"

Best R&B VideoMiliyah Kato — "Yūsha-Tachi"Ai — "Independent Woman"
Amy Winehouse — "Our Day Will Come"
Jason Derülo — "It Girl"
Mayer Hawthorne — "The Walk"

Best Hip-Hop VideoKreva — "Kijun"Drake — "Headlines"
Jay-Z & Kanye West featuring Otis Redding — "Otis"
Sick Team — "Street Wars"
Tyler, The Creator — "Yonkers"

Best Reggae VideoSean Paul — "She Doesn't Mind"Arare — "Your Puzzle"
Pushim — "Messenger"
SuperHeavy — "Miracle Worker"
The Heavymanners featuring Rumi — "Breath for Speaker"

Best Dance VideoPerfume — "Laser Beam"David Guetta featuring Flo Rida and Nicki Minaj — "Where Them Girls At"
James Blake — "Limit to Your Love"
SBTRKT — "Pharaohs"
Etsuko Yakushimaru & D.V.D. — "Gurugle Earth"

Best Video from a FilmBump of Chicken — "Good Luck" (from Always Sanchōme no Yūhi '64)Bruno Mars — "It Will Rain" (from The Twilight Saga: Breaking Dawn – Part 1)
Foo Fighters — "Walk" (from Thor)
Ziyoou-Vachi — "Disco" (from Moteki)
Superfly — "Ai wo Kurae" (from Smuggler)

Best CollaborationNamie Amuro featuring After School — "Make It Happen"Jay-Z & Kanye West featuring Otis Redding — "Otis"
Miliyah Kato x Shota Shimizu — "Believe"
Maroon 5 featuring Christina Aguilera — "Moves Like Jagger"
Special Others and Kj — "Sailin'"

Best ChoreographyPerfume — "Laser Beam" (choreography by Mikiko)Beyoncé — "Run the World (Girls)" (choreography by Frank Gatson, Sheryl Murakami and Jeffrey Page)
Chris Brown — "Yeah 3x"
LMFAO — "Party Rock Anthem" (choreography by Hokuto Konishi)
Shinee — "Lucifer" (choreography by Rino Okinawa and Jaewon Dancing)

Best Karaokee! SongSonar Pocket — "365 Nichi no Love Story."'''
Ayaka — "Hajimari no Toki"
Che'Nelle — "Baby I Love U"
Lady Gaga — "Judas"
Kana Nishino — "Esperanza"

Live performances
Linkin Park — "Lies Greed Misery / Numb / Burn It Down"
2NE1 — "Scream / I Am the Best"
Sandaime J Soul Brothers — "1st Place" / "Fighters"
Kyary Pamyu Pamyu — "Tsukema Tsukeru"
Bump of Chicken — "Zero"
Miliyah Kato — "Aiaiai / Heartbeat"
Exile — 24karats ~Exile Tribe Special Medley~
Juju — "Tadaima / Kiseki wo Nozomu Nara..."
2PM — "Beautiful / I'm Your Man"
Perfume — "Laser Beam / Spring of Life"

Guest celebrities
Karina — presented Best Pop Video
Scandal — presented Best R&B Video
DJ Kaori and World Order — introduced Sandaime J Soul Brothers
AAA — introduced Kyary Pamyu Pamyu
Ms. Ooja — presented Best Karaokee! Song
Daichi Miura — introduced Bump of Chicken
Beni — presented Best Group Video
W-inds — introduced Miliyah Kato
Rola — presented Best New Artist
Sonar Pocket — introduced Juju
E-Girls — introduced 2PM
Anna Tsuchiya — presented Video of the Year
Nobuaki Kaneko — introduced Perfume

References

External links
MTV Video Music Awards Japan website

2012 in Japanese music